In computer systems security, Relationship-based access control (ReBAC) defines an authorization paradigm where a subject's permission to access a resource is defined by the presence of relationships between those subjects and resources.

In general, authorization in ReBAC is performed by traversing the directed graph of relationships. The nodes and edges of this graph are very similar to triples in the Resource Description Framework (RDF) data format. ReBAC systems allow hierarchies of relationships, and some allow more complex definitions that include algebraic operators on relationships such as union, intersection, and difference.

ReBAC gained popularity with the rise of social network web applications, where users need to control their personal information based on their relationship with the data receiver rather than the receiver’s role.

In contrast to role-based access control (RBAC), which defines roles that carry a specific set of privileges associated with them and to which subjects are assigned, ReBAC (like ABAC), allows defining more fine-grained permissions. For example, if a ReBAC system defines resources of type document, which can allow one action editor, if the system contains the relationship ('alice', 'editor', 'document:budget'), then subject Alice can edit the specific resource document:budget. The downside of ReBAC is that, while it allows more fine-grained access, this means that the application may need to perform more authorization checks.

ReBAC systems are deny-by-default, and allow building RBAC systems on top of them.

History 
The term ReBAC was coined by Carrie E. Gates in 2006.

In 2019 Google published a paper presenting "Zanzibar: Google’s Consistent, Global Authorization System". The paper defines a system composed of a namespace configuration and relationship data expressed as triples. 

Since the release of that paper, several companies have built commercial and open source offerings of ReBAC systems.

See also 

 Role-based access control
 Attribute-based access control

References

External links 

 Introduction to Authorization and OpenFGA
 Relationship-Based Access Control (ReBAC)
 AuthZ: Carta’s highly scalable permissions system
 SpiceDB is the open source Zanzibar-inspired database that stores, computes, and validates fine grained permissions.

Access control
Computer security models